ِAutostrad is a Jordanian indie band from Amman, Jordan, formed in 2007.

Members
Autostrad's original lineup consisted of
Avo Demerjian - bass guitar and vocals
Bashar Hamdan - saxophone and keyboard
Hamzeh Arnaout - guitar and vocals
Wisam Qatawneh - keyboard and vocals
Yazan Al Rousan - guitar and main vocals
Burhan Al Ali - drums and vocals

There has been some changes in the line-up of the band with Hamzeh Arnaout (guitar) and Wisam Qatawneh (keyboards) leaving and admission of Yazan Sarayrah (guitars) and Mohannad Shwayat (keyboards).

The present line-up is now made up of: 
Avo Demerjian - bass guitar and vocals
Bashar Hamdan - saxophone and keyboard
Yazan Al Rousan - guitar, percussion and main vocals
Burhan Al Ali - drums and vocals
Yazan Sarayrah - lead guitar 
Mohannad Shwayat - Keyboard

Music
Autostrad's music is influenced by a mix of rock, reggae, Latin and funk combined with their own lyrics written in the Jordanian dialect. The topics draw inspiration from everyday life in Jordan, the group
conveys stories of love, struggle, financial challenges, drug abuse, and finding oneself through their music. The band has gained popularity amongst Jordanian youth because of their music evokes daily life in the country. They have released four studio albums: Fi Autostrad (2008), Autostrad (2011), Nitrogen (2013) and Turathi (2017).

Tours and appearances

In 2014, they were invited to play in London as part of their tour. It was their first time playing outside the Arab World.

They have also appeared several times on television, most notably when they were featured in a show by Ro'ya TV and also when they were hosted by Bassem Youssef on Egyptian TV show called Al Bernameg. They have also appeared in a number of RedBull SoundClash concerts, their first being in 2015 against  Jordanian band El Morabba3.

See also
Music of Jordan
Arabic music

References

External links
 Official Website

Jordanian rock music groups
Indie rock groups
Musical groups established in 2007
2007 establishments in Jordan